Bowers School may refer to:

 Bowers School (Clinton, Massachusetts), listed on the NRHP in Massachusetts
 Bowers School (Wilburton, Oklahoma), listed on the NRHP in Oklahoma